Menesia laosensis is a species of beetle in the family Cerambycidae. It was described by Stephan von Breuning in 1963. It is known from Laos.

References

Menesia
Beetles described in 1963